The Department of Housing and Urban Planning (IAST: Āvāsa Evaṃ Śaharī Niyojana Vibhāga), often abbreviated as DoHUP, is a department of Government of Uttar Pradesh responsible for coordinated and planned development with a comprehensive Master Plan along with the work of various other agencies involved in the creation and extension of urban infrastructure.

The Chief Minister serves as the departmental cabinet minister, and the Principal Secretary (Housing and Urban Planning), an IAS officer, is the administrative head of the department.

Functions 
Department of Housing and Urban Planning is responsible for making and implementing laws and policies related to Housing and Urban Planning. The department is also responsible for planned development of urban areas, through the 24 development authorities subordinate to it. The department, through Uttar Pradesh Housing and Development Board, is also responsible for providing affordable housing to those who need it.

Statutory, Autonomous and Attached bodies

 Real Estate Regulatory Authority
 Uttar Pradesh and Housing Development Board
 Awas Bandhu
 27 Development Authorities (Lucknow, Kanpur, Ayodhya, Prayagraj, Varanasi, Gorakhpur, Raebareli, Unnao, Ghaziabad, Agra, Meerut, Moradabad, Aligarh, Bareilly, Mathura-Vrindavan, Banda, Bulandshahr, Firozabad, Hapur-Philkua, Jhansi, Muzaffarnagar, Saharanpur, Rampur, Orai, Khurja, Baghpat, Azamgarh)
 5 Special Area Development Authorities (Shaktinagar, Chitakoot, Kapilvastu, Mirzapur and Kushinagar)

Important officials 
The Chief Minister of Uttar Pradesh, Yogi Adityanath, is the minister responsible for Department of Housing and Urban Planning.

The department's administration is headed by the Principal Secretary, who is an IAS officer, who is assisted by three Special Secretaries, two Joint Secretaries, and eight Deputy/Under Secretaries. The current Principal Secretary (DoHUP) is Devesh Chaturvedi.

Secretariat level

Head of Department Level

References 

Housing and Urban Planning
Uttar Pradesh
Uttar Pradesh